Fathabad Rural District is a rural district (dehestan) in the Central District of Qir and Karzin County, Fars Province, Iran. At the 2006 census, its population was 9,753, in 2,177 families.  The rural district has 20 villages.

References 

Rural Districts of Fars Province
Qir and Karzin County